Reuben C. Weddington was a state representative in Arkansas. A Republican, he served in the Arkansas House of Representatives in 1891. He represented Desha County.

Weddington was born in Rodney, Mississippi. He studied at Alcorn University. He was a public school principal in Red Lick, Mississippi for four years before moving to Arkansas in 1887 where he settled in Arkansas City and was principal of a graded school.

His photograph was included in a montage of the 11 African American legislators in the Arkansas Legislature in 1891.

References 

People from Jefferson County, Mississippi
Alcorn State University alumni
American school principals
People from Arkansas City, Arkansas
Arkansas Republicans
19th-century American politicians
African-American state legislators in Arkansas
19th-century African-American people
Year of birth missing
Year of death missing
Place of death missing
1891 deaths